Celathara was a town of Ancient Thessaly. Livy relates that the retreat of Philip V of Macedon after the Battle of the Aous (198 BC) allowed the Aetolians to occupy much of Thessaly, and these latter plundered Celathara and nearby Theuma, whereas Acharrae surrendered.

References

Cities in ancient Greece
Populated places in ancient Thessaly
Lost ancient cities and towns
Former populated places in Greece